Opaka Rocks (‘Skali Opaka’ ska-'li 'o-pa-ka) are a group of rocks with the principal one situated  north of Henfield Rock,  east of Pordim Islands and 4.79 km west by south of Mellona Rocks off the north coast of Robert Island, South Shetland Islands.  Bulgarian early early mapping in 2009.  Named after the town of Opaka in northeastern Bulgaria.

See also 
 Composite Antarctic Gazetteer
 List of Antarctic islands south of 60° S
 SCAR
 Territorial claims in Antarctica

Maps
 L.L. Ivanov. Antarctica: Livingston Island and Greenwich, Robert, Snow and Smith Islands. Scale 1:120000 topographic map.  Troyan: Manfred Wörner Foundation, 2009.

Notes

References
 Opaka Rocks. SCAR Composite Antarctic Gazetteer
 Bulgarian Antarctic Gazetteer. Antarctic Place-names Commission. (details in Bulgarian, basic data in English)

External links
 Opaka Rocks. Copernix satellite image

Rock formations of Robert Island
Bulgaria and the Antarctic